Irene Kirpal (1 January 1886 – 17 December 1977) was a Czechoslovakian politician. In 1920 she was one of the first group of women elected to the Chamber of Deputies, remaining in parliament until 1938.

Biography
Kirpal was born Irene Grundmann into a Jewish family in Horschitz in Austria-Hungary (now Hořice in the Czech Republic) in 1886. Between 1902 and her marriage in 1912, she worked in education. She joined the Social Democratic Workers' Party of Austria in 1912 and became chair of the women's section in Aussig (Ústí nad Labem) in 1915.

Following the independence of Czechoslovakia at the end of World War I, Kirpal was a municipal councillor in Ústí nad Labem from 1918 to 1920. She joined the German Social Democratic Workers' Party (DSAP) in 1919, and the following year was one of its candidates for the Chamber of Deputies in the parliamentary elections, in which she was one of sixteen women elected to parliament. She was subsequently re-elected in 1925, 1929 and 1935, serving in the Chamber of Deputies until the Nazi annexation of the Sudetenland in 1938. She subsequently lived in exile in the United Kingdom, returning to Czechoslovakia in 1946. She died in Ústí nad Labem in 1977.

References

1886 births
People from Hořice
Austro-Hungarian Jews
Austro-Hungarian educators
Czechoslovak Jews
Czechoslovak women in politics
Members of the Chamber of Deputies of Czechoslovakia (1920–1925)
Members of the Chamber of Deputies of Czechoslovakia (1925–1929)
Members of the Chamber of Deputies of Czechoslovakia (1929–1935)
Members of the Chamber of Deputies of Czechoslovakia (1935–1939)
German Social Democratic Workers' Party in the Czechoslovak Republic politicians
Czechoslovak expatriates in the United Kingdom
1977 deaths